Bowling at the 2017 Asian Indoor and Martial Arts Games was held in Ashgabat, Turkmenistan from 21 to 27 September 2017 at the Bowling Center.

Medalists

Men

Women

Medal table

Results

Men

Singles
21 September

Preliminary

Knockout round

Doubles
23 September

Preliminary

Knockout round

Team of 4

Preliminary
25 September

Knockout round

Women

Singles
22 September

Preliminary

Knockout round

Doubles
24 September

Preliminary

Knockout round

Team of 4

Preliminary
25 September

Knockout round

References 
 Medalists by events

External links
 Official website
 Results book – Bowling

2017 Asian Indoor and Martial Arts Games events
Asian Indoor and Martial Arts Games
2017